The Don is a 2006 Indian Malayalam-language action thriller film directed by Shaji Kailas from a story written by J. Pallassery. It stars an ensemble cast of Dileep, Lal, Sai Kumar, Gopika, Shammi Thilakan, Bheeman Raghu, Baburaj and Chitra Shenoy.

The Don was released on 5 September 2006 where it received negative reviews from critics and became a box-office bomb.

Premise 
Unnikrishnan aka Salaam becomes the most trusted man to Kasim. However, when Kasim is found dead Salaam is blamed, where he sets out to prove his innocence.

Cast 

Dileep as Unnikrishnan / Salaam
Lal as Kasim Baba
Saikumar as Advocate Subramaniam Swami 
Maniyanpilla Raju as MLA Abdullah Kutty
Harisree Asokan as Salim, Unni's friend
Gopika as Shahida
Chitra Shenoy as Baba's wife
Bheeman Raghu as Sikandar
Baburaj as Abootty
Kazan Khan as Sharon Bhai
Lalu Alex as Superintendent Vishwanathan
Spadikam George as D.Y.S.P Anirudhan
Shammi Thilakan as Sulaiman, Baba's nephew
Subair as Koya Sahib
Sreejith Ravi as Vasu, Unni's friend
Anil Murali as Joji, Unni's friend
Augustine as Kabir Bhai
Sukumari as Devakiamma

Production
This film marks the first collaboration between Shaji Kailas and Dileep. Pooja was initially considered to be the heroine, but the role went to Gopika.

Release 
The Don was scheduled to release before Onam, before the release was pushed to the first week of September.

Critical response 
Paresh C. Palicha of Rediff.com gave the film a rating of one out of five stars and wrote "The Don is simply a hotchpotch of many action-drama films, clumsily put together". A critic from Webindia123 wrote that "It may be better for Dileep to stop trying to become an action hero". A critic from Indiaglitz stated that "The screenplay of Pallaserry offers nothing new. And with the song which arrives an hour into the proceedings, the tempo slackens". Unni Nair of Nowrunning said that "The Don is not his [Shaji Kailas'] worst effort yet".

Future
Dileep and Shaji Kailas were reported to collaborate again for another film produced by Dileep, but it did not materialise.

References

2006 films
2006 action films
Indian action films
Indian gangster films
2000s Malayalam-language films
Films directed by Shaji Kailas